Frederic Cook may refer to:

 Frederic Charles Cook (1810–1889), English churchman and linguist
 Frederic W. Cook (1873–1951), American politician in Massachusetts

See also
 Frederick Cook (disambiguation)